Diptilon aurantiipes is a moth of the subfamily Arctiinae. It was described by Rothschild in 1911. It is found in Brazil.

The wingspan is about 24 mm. The forewings are hyaline (glass like) with brown veins and margins and a yellow streak below the postmedial part of the costa. The hindwings are hyaline with pale brownish veins and margins.

References

Euchromiina
Moths described in 1911